Christian Zetlitz Bretteville (17 November 1800 – 24 February 1871) was a Norwegian politician who served as Prime Minister 1858–1859 and in 1861 and who held several other cabinet positions between 1850 and 1871. He was also mayor of Christiania.

Political career

He was Minister of Finance 1850-1852 and 1853–1854, Minister of the Interior in six periods 1854–1871, as well as head of the Ministry of Auditing 1855-1856, a member of the Councils and interim Councils of State Division in Stockholm in several periods from 1852–1866, and as Prime Minister 1858–1859 and in 1861.

He was mayor of Christiania in 1841.

Family
He belonged to the French Norman noble family le Normand de Bretteville, and was the son of tax collector in Paris and Brest Charles Eugene le Normand de Bretteville and Mette Christina Zetlitz. His grandfather, General and Marquis Louis Claude le Normand de Bretteville (1744–1835) fled the French Revolution and was naturalized as a Dano-Norwegian nobleman in 1804. His daughter Blanca Bretteville was married to the judge Johann Ludwig Wegner, a son of the industrialist Benjamin Wegner.

References

1800 births
1871 deaths
Prime Ministers of Norway
Government ministers of Norway
Mayors of Oslo
Place of birth missing
Place of death missing
19th-century Norwegian politicians
Ministers of Finance of Norway